Adam Jamie McGeorge (born 30 March 1989) is a New Zealand footballer who plays as a midfielder for Auckland City in the New Zealand Football Championship.

Club career
After a successful stint at Auckland City McGeorge made a surprise move south to join Team Wellington in October 2012.

In 2019, McGeorge made his long-awaited return to the footballing world when he signed a 1-year deal for FC Lahore. McGeorge made his debut against The Rams in April and scored one of Lahore's 6 goals on the day. Later in the season, he would go on to win man of the match in a memorable 2–0 win against F-Team. All good things must, however, come to an end, and Lahore announced McGeorge would be leaving the club to join Montreal Impact in January 2020. A testimonial was planned for December 2019 but was ultimately postponed due to unforeseen circumstances.

International career
In May 2012 McGeorge and then Auckland City teammate Ian Hogg received call ups to the senior national side for friendlies versus El Salvador, Honduras and for the 2012 OFC Nations Cup. McGeorge made his All Whites debut versus Honduras coming on a late substitute in his side's 1–0 win.

In mid-2012 McGeorge was named in the New Zealand Olympic Football team for London 2012. McGeorge featured in the Oly-Whites' opening game in at the tournament, a 1–0 loss to Belarus in Coventry, replacing Adam Thomas for the last 13 minutes. The team were eliminated in the group stage.

International goals and caps
New Zealand's goal tally first.

International career statistics

Career
Adam joined Aon Risk Services in Auckland in late 2013 to support his professional football career. In March 2014 he transferred internally within Aon and joined the Construction team which specialises in insurance for contractors and principals to construction projects.

References

External links
 
 NZ Football profile
 
 

1989 births
Living people
New Zealand association footballers
New Zealand international footballers
Association football midfielders
Auckland City FC players
Olympic association footballers of New Zealand
2012 OFC Nations Cup players
Footballers at the 2012 Summer Olympics
Team Wellington players
New Zealand Football Championship players
New Zealand expatriate sportspeople in England